Daniel Mensah, also known as Hello, is a Ga carpenter and fantasy coffin artist. He works as an independent artist and carpenter in Teshie, Greater Accra, Ghana.

Biography 
Born in 1968 in Teshie, Daniel Mensah did his six-year apprenticeship from 1984 until 1990 with the Ga coffin artist Paa Joe who was trained by Kane Kwei (1924-1992) in Teshie. When Mensah finished his apprenticeship, he worked for eight years with Paa Joe in Nungua as a master carpenter until he opened in 1998 his own studio called "Hello Design Coffin Works" in Teshie. Mensah participated in various art exhibitions in Europe and in some European film projects, like "Sépulture sur mesure" from Philippe Lespinasse. Some of his fantasy coffins are in the collection of the British Museum in London, in the Sainsbury Centre for Visual Arts in Norwich and in private art collections.

Exhibitions 
 2009–2010: Living and Dying Gallery, British Museum, London.
 2011: "Ghanaian Fantasy Coffin“, Sainsbury Centre for Visual Arts, University of East Anglia, Norwich.

Documentaries 
 2009 "Ghana, Sépulture sur mesure"; Philippe Lespinasse, Grand Angle Productions, TV5Monde.
 2011 "Hidden Treasure of Africa“; Griff Rhys Jones, BBC.

Bibliography 
 Regula Tschumi. 2008. The Buried Treasures of the Ga. Coffin Art in Ghana. Benteli, pp. 122–123, 229.

References 

1968 births
Living people
Coffins
Contemporary sculptors
Ga-Adangbe people
20th-century Ghanaian sculptors
Ghanaian male artists
Male sculptors
20th-century male artists
21st-century Ghanaian sculptors
21st-century male artists
People from Greater Accra Region